The World Field Target Federation (WFTF) is the governing body for the shooting sport discipline of Field target. The WFTF specifies and regulates World Championship, International or other major field target events. The WFTF has 43 member federations spread across all 6 continents.

Administration
The WFTF is managed by a president elected by nomination and majority vote from representatives of each National Governing Body (NGB) who serves for a period of three years.

Management of the world championship is the responsibility of the chairman of the hosting countries NGB and will act as Vice-President of the federation until the end of the hosted championship.

World Championships

Categories
Field target is contested on an open competition basis, with all competitors eligible to win the overall championship in their class. There are two classes of shooting:
 Precharged (for competitors using PCP air rifles)
 Spring (for those using Spring-piston air rifles)

Each class offers the following placings:
 World Champion and 2nd to 10th
 1st Lady
 1st Veteran
 1st Junior
 1st to 3rd Teams

Host country
The location of the championships is based on rotation between the 43 member countries of the WFTF, a country via its NGB has the opportunity to decline hosting of the event in which case the opportunity to host passes onto the next member country in sequence.

Results

Men's PCP Category

PCP Category Firsts

Team PCP Category

References

External links
 

Field target shooters